Byttneria jaramilloana is a species of flowering plant in the family Malvaceae. It is found only in Ecuador. Its natural habitats are subtropical or tropical moist montane forests, subtropical or tropical dry shrubland, and subtropical or tropical high-altitude shrubland.

References

jaramilloana
Endemic flora of Ecuador
Vulnerable plants
Taxonomy articles created by Polbot